Pectinivalva mystaconota is a moth of the family Nepticulidae. It is known from scattered localities in eastern Australia from Wellington, New South Wales south to Mount Nelson, Hobart, Tasmania.

The wingspan is 5.8-7.6 mm for males and 7.5-8.0 mm for females. The thorax and forewings are blackish fuscous and weakly shining. The hindwings are clothed in dark brown scales with iridescent reflections.

Etymology
The specific name is derived from the Greek mystax (meaning moustache) and notos (meaning back) and refers to the tuft of hair-scales on T5 in the male.

References

Moths described in 2013
Moths of Australia
Nepticulidae